Brezovka is a village and municipality in Bardejov District in the Prešov Region of north-east Slovakia.

History
In historical records the village was first mentioned in 1572.

Geography
The municipality lies at an altitude of 360 metres and covers an area of 3.268 km².
It has a population of about 79 people.

Genealogical resources

The records for genealogical research are available at the state archive "Statny Archiv in Presov, Slovakia"

 Roman Catholic church records (births/marriages/deaths): 1750-1896 (parish B)
 Greek Catholic church records (births/marriages/deaths): 1852-1924 (parish B)

See also
 List of municipalities and towns in Slovakia

References

External links
 
https://web.archive.org/web/20071116010355/http://www.statistics.sk/mosmis/eng/run.html
Surnames of living people in Brezovka

Villages and municipalities in Bardejov District
Šariš